Nelo (MAR Kayaks Ltda) is a Portuguese company that designs and manufactures kayaks and canoes for racing, touring, fitness, sea racing, paracanoe, surfski, and slalom. It is currently the most successful brand in the sport, attested by the number of medals won by its boats in the London 2012 Olympics.

Nelo was founded in 1978 by Manuel Alberto Ramos (known as Nelo by his friends and family), a former paddler himself and the first Portuguese Canoeing National Champion.

More recently the company has broadened its scope and also provides services and products related to canoeing like organizing race events, training centers, athlete performance analysis, training wear, among others. It also recently started to manufacture racing shells for rowing.

Location
Nelo's headquarters and main factories are based in Vila do Conde, a small city in the north of Portugal. Besides the main factory and office, Nelo is spread throughout the world, through its network of official agents and by direct sales.

References

Nelo